The inaugural Cambridgeshire and Peterborough mayoral election was held on 4 May 2017 to elect the Mayor of Cambridgeshire and Peterborough. The supplementary vote system was used to elect the mayor for a four-year term of office. Subsequent elections will be held in May 2021 and every four years after.

The mayor will lead the Cambridgeshire and Peterborough Combined Authority established in 2017 by the seven local councils in Cambridgeshire (Cambridgeshire County Council, Peterborough City Council, Cambridge City Council, East Cambridgeshire District Council, Fenland District Council, Huntingdonshire District Council and South Cambridgeshire District Council) as part of a devolution deal giving local government in the county additional powers and funding.

The mayoral election was on the same day as the Cambridgeshire County Council election being held across most of the county except Peterborough, which is administered separately as a unitary authority outside the area covered by the county council.

Candidates

Conservative Party
James Palmer, leader of East Cambridgeshire District Council, was selected to be the Conservative Party candidate at a general meeting of party members on 21 January 2017. The shortlist for the selection process was announced on 14 January and consisted of three candidates:
 Steve Count, councillor for March North, leader of Cambridgeshire County Council and the first interim chairman of the combined authority.
 Roger Harrison, councillor for St Neots Eaton Socon and executive member for growth, Huntingdonshire District Council.
 James Palmer, district councillor for Soham North, county councillor for Soham and Fordham Villages and leader of East Cambridgeshire District Council.

Heidi Allen, MP for South Cambridgeshire since 2015, declared an intention to seek the Conservative nomination but was unsuccessful in reaching the final shortlist. Marco Cereste, former leader of Peterborough City Council, also failed to make the shortlist.

English Democrats
Stephen Goldspink, former Peterborough city councillor, was the English Democrats mayoral candidate.

Green Party
Julie Howell, Orton parish councillor and co-leader of Peterborough Green Party, was announced as the Green Party candidate on 19 January 2017 after a vote by party members.

Independent
Peter Dawe, former UKIP member and Ely-based social entrepreneur, stood as an independent candidate for mayor. On 25 January, Dawe announced he had chosen Peterborough-based entrepreneur Mark Ringer, founder and director of the Willow Festival, to be his unofficial running mate and deputy.

Labour Party
Kevin Price, deputy leader of Cambridge City Council and councillor for King's Hedges, was declared the winner of the Labour Party selection process on 6 February 2017 after defeating Fiona Onasanya, county councillor for King's Hedges, in a ballot of party members.

Other candidates who did not make the shortlist but were reported in local media as contesting the Labour Party selection included Peterborough City councillors Ed Murphy and Ansar Ali, 2015 Huntingdon parliamentary candidate Nik Johnson, and vice-chairman of Huntingdon CLP Samuel Sweek.

Liberal Democrats
Rod Cantrill, councillor for Newnham, Cambridge City Council, was announced as the Liberal Democrat candidate on 14 January 2017 following a ballot of party members.

United Kingdom Independence Party
Paul Bullen, councillor for St Ives and UKIP group leader, Cambridgeshire County Council, was confirmed as the party's candidate on 11 January 2017.

Results 
Nominations for candidates wishing to stand in the election closed on 4 April 2017, after which the final list of candidates was published by East Cambridgeshire District Council.

Results by local authority 
First and second preference votes were counted by local authority and published online by East Cambridgeshire District Council.

First count results

Second count results

References

2017 English local elections
Mayoral elections in England
Elections in Cambridgeshire
May 2017 events in the United Kingdom